The Lamborghini Huracán (Spanish for "hurricane") is a sports car manufactured by Italian automotive manufacturer Lamborghini replacing the previous V10 offering, the Gallardo. The Huracán was revealed online in December 2013, making its worldwide debut at the 2014 Geneva Auto Show, and was released in the market in the second quarter of 2014.

Name
The Huracán's name (huracán being the Spanish word for hurricane) is inspired by a Spanish fighting bull. Historic Spanish fighting bulls have traditionally provided the names of most Lamborghini car models. Huracán was a bull known for its courage that fought in 1879.

Specifications and performance

Specifications

Engine
To ensure its balance and performance, the car is mid-engined. The engine has both direct fuel injection and multi-point fuel injection. It combines the benefits of both of these systems; it is the first time this combination is used in a V10 engine. To increase its efficiency, the Huracán's engine also includes a start-stop system. The firing order of the engine is 1, 6, 5, 10, 2, 7, 3, 8, 4, 9. This is printed on a metal plate on the top of the engine, as with all other Lamborghini models.

The  was undisclosed until 2021.

Performance

Road test measurements of LP 610-4
0–: 2.5 seconds
0–: 27.6 seconds
0– mile: 10.4 seconds at  
0–: 19.1 seconds at 
Maximum speed:

Technical information 

The Huracán has an electronically controlled all-wheel drive system, which aims to increase the traction on various surfaces and the overall performance of the car. The car has a 7-speed dual clutch transmission, Lamborghini's new 'Doppia Frizione' (Dual Clutch) gearbox.  The transmission performs differently depending on the mode the driver has selected. The different drive modes available are Sport, Strada and Corsa, Corsa being the highest performance mode. The Huracán will only be available with an automatic transmission; a manual will not be offered.

The Huracán also has a magnetically controlled suspension system. It utilises magnetorheological dampers to very quickly change how the suspension acts, ensuring performance as well as usability.

The Huracán has various components in common with the second generation of the Audi R8. This is due to the sharing of Volkswagen's sports car technology among both of the cars.

Interior

The Huracán has various interior options for upgraded comfort inside the car. It has a choice for full electric control and heating of the sport seats in addition to the standard lengthwise alignment and electric backrest.  The car also has an optional navigation system and leather upholstering. The Huracán is one of the first sports cars moving the infotainment system out of the center stack: Lamborghini Infotainment System. The result: a display that lets the driver decide what they want to see. It is the first Lamborghini automobile to use the 12.3 inch TFT virtual cockpit from parent company Audi, which is available with high-definition (1440 x 540) 3D computer graphics, Bluetooth, Google Earth GPS navigation and Multi Media Interface-like menu and dashboard controls, all powered by Nvidia Tegra 3.

Technology
Various aspects of the Huracán are technologically advanced. The car has full LED headlamps, which ensure higher contrast in night conditions. Also, the Huracán has optional "Lamborghini Dynamic Steering" (LDS) to add to the standard power steering. The Dynamic Steering changes the steering performance from normal, comfortable steering to a racing feeling. The main control for changing the car's performance according to driving conditions is the mode selector ANIMA (Adaptive Network Intelligent Management). ANIMA controls the engine, the transmission, LDS, the all-wheel drive, magnetorheological suspension, and the electronic stability control. The Lamborghini Piattaforma Inerziale (LPI) carries out precise measurements of the vehicle movements using on board sensors (3 accelerometers and 3 gyroscopes) linked to ANIMA via high-speed FlexRay CAN bus. The driver can select street, sport, or race mode to alter how systems like the engine or transmission respond while driving.

Huracán (2014–2019)

Huracán LP 610-4 Coupé (2014–2019) 
The LP 610-4 designation comes from the car having 610 metric horsepower and four-wheel drive, while LP stands for "Longitudinale Posteriore", which refers to the longitudinal mid-rear engine position.

Changes from the Gallardo include full LED illumination, a 12.3 inch full-colour TFT instrument panel, fine napa leather and Alcantara interior upholstery, redesigned dashboard and central tunnel, Iniezione Diretta Stratificata (IDS, essentially an adapted version of parent Audi's Fuel Stratified Injection) direct and indirect gasoline injections, engine Stop & Start technology, EU6 emissions regulation compliance, Lamborghini Doppia Frizione (LDF) 7-speed dual-clutch transmission with 3 modes (STRADA, SPORT and CORSA), 20-inch wheels, carbon-ceramic braking system, optional Lamborghini Dynamic Steering variable steering system and MagneRide electromagnetic damper control.

The main competitors of the Huracán include the McLaren 650S (as well as the 720S), the Audi R8, the Ferrari 458 Speciale and the 488 GTB. Extra options that increase the price of the car include interior enhancements, special paint schemes, improved suspension, and a lifting system, as well as multiple components optionally available in carbon fibre, rather than aluminium.

Huracán LP 610-4 Spyder (2016–2019)

The convertible variant of the Huracán LP 610-4 was revealed at the Frankfurt Motor Show on 14 September 2015. It has the same 7-speed Lamborghini Doppia Frizione (LDF) dual-clutch transmission as that of the coupé. The Spyder has a  emission of about 280 g/km.

Huracán LP 580-2 (2016–2019) 
It also features slight visual differences to the standard variant of the car – with a different front fascia and larger air vents at the rear of the car for improved brake cooling. The seven-speed dual-clutch transmission is the same as used in the standard LP 610–4. The base level LP 580-2 costs , about  less than the base level LP 610–4.

Huracán LP 580-2 Spyder (2016–2019) 
A convertible variant of the Huracán LP 580-2 was unveiled at the Los Angeles Auto Show on 16 November 2016.

Huracán LP 640-4 Performante (2017–2019) 

A track oriented variant of the Huracán, called the Performante, was unveiled at the 2017 Geneva Motor Show.

The Performante underwent various exterior changes with the most noticeable being the front and rear bumpers. Carbon fibre is used for the bumpers and the side skirts. An adjustable carbon fibre rear wing has been added to increase downforce. The position of the exhaust has also been changed, and is now just a bit above the rear diffuser. The interior also underwent noticeable changes, now sporting new seats and a new digital speedometer (similar to that of the Aventador SV's speedometer).

All the new aero components on the car have active aerodynamic capability and help keep the car stable at high speeds.

The car has been stiffened by 10% with new springs, roll bars, and radial axial arm bushings. The magnetorheological suspension has been reworked to give a driver a serious track experience. The Lamborghini Dynamic Steering has been re-calibrated. The Performante utilises Lamborghini's new ALA (Aerodinamica Lamborghini Attiva) system, which is said to be 80% lighter than regular sports car hydraulic systems. According to Lamborghini, ALA is also said to provide 750% more downforce than the standard Huracán. The price of the car is set at US$274,390.

Huracán LP 640-4 Performante Spyder (2018–2019)
The Lamborghini Huracán Performante Spyder was unveiled at the 2018 Geneva Motor Show. It takes much of the styling inspiration from the coupé and the outgoing LP 610-4 Spyder. The Spyder is identical to the coupé from performance and technological standpoint, but the acceleration time from  has risen by one-tenth of a second and stands at 3.1 seconds while the  has risen by four-tenths of a second and stands at 9.3 seconds. Due to the loss of the roof, the Spyder weighs  more than the coupé due to chassis reinforcing components. Deliveries of the Spyder began in the fourth quarter of 2018.

Facelift (2019-present)

Huracán Evo (2019–present) 

The Huracán received a mid-cycle update in 2019, now being called the Huracán Evo. It now shares its engine and some of the technology with the Performante variant.

The updated version of the Huracán has a more aggressive design language, the new front bumper has integrated aeroblades for improved downforce along with the rear styling inspired by the Performante variant, having the same rear diffuser, exhaust pipe position and radiators. A new ducktail spoiler improves downforce by 5 times as compared to the outgoing model.

The exhaust system is more refined and has titanium intake valves.

The Huracán Evo has a rear-wheel steering system for improved handling and a torque vectoring system. A new central processing unit controls the various functions of the car and monitors various settings. The control system is controlled by the new infotainment system (via an 8.4 inch touchscreen) dubbed the Lamborghini Dinamica Veicolo Integrata which has integrated both Apple CarPlay and Android Auto. The infotainment system predicts the driving modes by a feed forward logic.

The feed forward logic works by sensors monitoring the lateral, longitudinal and vertical accelerations, as well as roll, pitch and yaw rate to predict the best possible driving mode for the driver. The magnetorheological suspension is also revised and now uses electromagnetic current to adjust the suspension system in accordance with the driving mode.

The transmission system from the outgoing model is retained which transfers power to all four wheels. A new Ego mode allows the driver to change driving settings to their own preference.

Huracán Evo Spyder (2019–present) 

The Huracán Evo Spyder was introduced online in February 2019. The Spyder has the same enhancements as the coupé but is  heavier due to the addition of chassis reinforcement components owing to the loss of the roof.

Huracán Evo RWD (2020–present) 
A rear-wheel drive variant of the Evo debuted in January 2020, replacing the LP 580-2. The front splitter has been reshaped and generates more airflow, which is directed to the revised diffuser. Unique to the RWD model is P-TCS (Performance Traction Control System) that ensures that torque is not cut off abruptly; Lamborghini claims this increases oversteer by 30 percent compared to the LP 580-2. The car also receives a unique paint option, Giallo Belenus, along with a matching interior upholstered in leather and microsuede.

Huracán Evo RWD Spyder (2020–present) 
A convertible version of the rear-wheel drive variant of the Evo was showcased in May 2020, replacing the LP 580-2 Spyder.

Huracán STO (2021–present)

The Huracán STO (Super Trofeo Omologato) is a track focused variant of the Huracán. It is completely different from other Huracán variants. The STO has a taller rear wing with a roof snorkel for engine cooling. There is a shark fin aerodynamic device connecting the roof snorkel with the rear wing. The engine cover is reminiscent of the Lamborghini Super Trofeo Evo race cars. The entire hood opens to reveal a small compartment for storing racing equipment and the body is made of 75% carbon fibre. The engine and the power output of the STO is the same as the Huracán Perfomante and the Huracán Evo and it has rear-wheel drive with a rear wheel steering system and CCMR Brakes inspired from Formula 1. The STO comes with three new driving modes: STO for road driving, TROFEO for fast lap times on dry tarmac, and PIOGGIA for wet weather driving. The bucket seats on the interior feature racing harnesses.

Huracán Tecnica (2022–present) 

Unveiled on April 12, 2022, The Huracán Tecnica sits between the EVO RWD and the track-focused STO. It is  longer than the EVO, but is the same height and width. According to Lamborghini, the Tecnica's aerodynamic changes increase downforce 35 percent and reduce drag by 20 percent compared to the EVO.

Special editions

Huracán LP 610-4 Polizia (2014)
The Huracán LP 610-4 Polizia is the official police car variant specifically produced for the Italian State Police, after the one Gallardo used by the Polizia Stradale were destroyed in the course of patrol duty. This model sports various features exclusive to the car, such as blue Polizia body colour, white stripes and lettering following the Huracán's dynamic design language, a video system positioned in the centre of the cabin with a camera fitted next to the rear view mirror, a police computer, recording equipment behind the seats, a Proof Video Data System, gun holster, police radio equipment, a Paletta (the traditional hand-held stop sign used to advise motorists and traffic offenders to pull over), a removable screen, a refrigeration system at the luggage compartment in the front of the vehicle (for use in the vehicle's role in transporting organs for transplantation), a defibrillator, and a police beacon with blue LEDs around the base and white LED signals on the front, sides and rear of the light's aluminium shell.

Huracán LP 610-4 Avio (2016–2017)

Unveiled at the 2016 Geneva Motor Show, the Avio is the first limited edition of the Huracán, bringing new colours, upholstery, exterior decals and interior logos inspired by the Italian fighter jets along with featuring a tricolore cockade in Red, White and Green. On the centre console there is a plaque indicating the limited number from 250 examples offered.

Huracán Evo GT Celebration 
The Huracán Evo GT Celebration is a limited edition model with a limited production of 36 units. It pays tribute to the victories of 2018 and 2019 at the 24 Hours of Daytona and the 12 Hours of Sebring. The number 36 is the sum time of the two famous endurance races, also known as the “36 Hours of Florida”. It was unveiled with another special edition, the Lamborghini Aventador SVJ 63 Roadster, at Monterey Car Week in California in August 2019. Visually, the car has a unique green livery with orange accents commemorating the motorsport achievements of the brand. The car shares its engine with the Huracán GT3 race car and is limited to North American market only.

Huracán Sterrato 

In June 2019, Lamborghini introduced an off-road concept sports car based on the Huracán Evo called the Huracán Sterrato. The car is fitted with 20-inch wheels with special tyres for increased grip during off-roading. The car also comes with a reinforced frame and integrated skidpads for protection against debris. Fog lights fitted at the front and a roof rack complete the aggressive exterior appearance.

The engine is shared with the Huracán Evo and has the same output as the Evo. The LDVI (Lamborghini Dinamica Veicolo Integrata) system is modified and now comes with predictive logic, conceived as a sophisticated central processing unit that controls every aspect of the car's behavior, perfectly integrating dynamic systems to anticipate driver actions and needs, translating them into a perfect driving dynamics.

The production Huracán Sterrato was unveiled at Art Basel in Miami on November 30, 2022. It is an all-terrain variant of the Hurácan. Changes over other variants include a 1.7-inch higher ground clearance, revamped suspension with greater travel, widened front and rear track, LED lights mounted to the front bumper, additional protective underbody sills, and Bridgestone all-terrain tires. In addition, it features a unique Rally mode, which optimizes the suspension and all-wheel drive system for driving on gravel, dirt, and sand. 

In November 2022, Lamborghini confirmed that the Hurácan Sterrato will be the last non-hybrid model to be launched.

Production
The Huracán's chassis is assembled by Lamborghini's parent company Audi in Neckarsulm, Germany. It is transported to the Lamborghini headquarters in Sant'Agata Bolognese, Italy, where the final assembly occurs.

Within the first month of the Huracán LP 610-4 preview period, 700 orders of the vehicle were obtained. Before the official launch, Lamborghini registered more than 1,000 orders of the Huracán LP 610–4.

Marketing

The Huracán LP 610-4 Coupé (in Midas yellow body colour) appeared in Forza Horizon 2 as the "hero car", where the car was featured in the box art cover for both the Xbox One and Xbox 360 editions of the game.

For the 2016 Marvel Studios film Doctor Strange, Lamborghini gave Marvel Studios 6 grey Lamborghini Huracáns, 2 for stunts, 2 for special effects, and 2 "hero ones".

Motorsport

Huracán LP 620-2 Super Trofeo (2014–2019) 
The Huracán LP 620-2 Super Trofeo is a racing version of the Huracán for the 2015 Lamborghini Blancpain Super Trofeo Series (Europe, Asia and North America).

The vehicle was unveiled at the ACI Vallelunga Circuit.

Huracán LP 620-2 Super Trofeo EVO (2019–present)
The Huracán LP 620-2 Super Trofeo EVO is the successor to the Huracán LP 620-2 Super Trofeo.

Huracán Super Trofeo EVO Collector's Edition 
The Huracán Super Trofeo EVO Collector's Edition is a limited-run version of the Huracán Super Trofeo EVO. The unique colour theme is done so in collaboration with Roger DuBuis, a famous watchmaker.

Huracán LP 620-2 Super Trofeo EVO2 (2022–present)

The Huracán LP 620-2 Super Trofeo EVO2 was announced in May 2021. It features major aerodynamic refinements and more powerful brakes over the Super Trofeo EVO. Its front end has been redesigned with new  headlights, air curtains on both sides of the bumper, and a reshaped splitter made with carbon fibre. In the rear, the LED lights are thinner and the diffuser is bigger. The rocker panel extensions and some of the aerodynamic elements fitted to the rear end are now made with the lightweight material rather than with plastic. Lamborghini's Squadra Corsa division developed a new braking system in-house featuring bigger brake rotors and redesigned calipers capable of housing larger brake pads. Teams racing a Super Trofeo EVO will be able to purchase an upgrade kit to bring their car to EVO2 specifications.

Huracán GT3 (2015–2019)
Introduced in 2015, The Lamborghini Huracán GT3 was developed in collaboration with Dallara.

It debuted in the 2015 Blancpain GT Series Endurance Cup race held in Monza and secured an impressive win in its first competitive outing with Grasser Racing Team. Team Lazarus won the 2016 International GT Open with drivers Thomas Biagi and Fabrizio Crestani. Also, Barwell Motorsport claimed four wins in the 2016 British GT Championship and won the Teams' Championship in 2017, Grasser Racing Team won a race at the 2016 ADAC GT Masters, and Paul Miller Racing won at the 2016 WeatherTech SportsCar Championship. The 2017 Blancpain GT Series was also won by Grasser Racing Team with professional drivers Andrea Caldarelli, Mirko Bortolotti and Christian Engelhart. The #63 Huracán GT3 driven by them took overall victories in the Endurance Cup races at Monza and Silverstone, as well as the Sprint Cup race held at Brands Hatch. FFF Racing Team won the 2018 Blancpain GT Series Asia with Martin Kodrić and Dennis Lind.

On 28 January 2018 on the first race of the 2018 WeatherTech SportsCar Championship, the  11 Lamborghini Huracán GT3 of GRT Grasser Racing Team finished first at the 2018 24 Hours of Daytona in the GTD class. It was the first time that Lamborghini has won a 24-hour race in history. The  48 Huracán of Paul Miller Racing went on to win the drivers, teams, and manufacturers championships for Lamborghini.

Huracán GT3 Evo (2019–2022) 

The Huracán GT3 Evo is the successor to the Huracán GT3.

It made its racing debut in the 2019 24 Hours of Daytona, the opening round of the 2019 WeatherTech SportsCar Championship, where it took the GTD class victory for a second time with Grasser Racing Team. The #11 Huracán GT3 Evo was driven by Mirko Bortolotti, Rik Breukers, Christian Engelhart and Rolf Ineichen. The same car also won the GTD class in the 2019 12 Hours of Sebring, which was the second race of the 2019 WeatherTech SportsCar Championship, while another Huracán GT3 Evo from Magnus Racing took second place. In the 11th round at Laguna Seca, the #48 Huracán GT3 Evo of Paul Miller Racing took victory in the GTD class.

FFF Racing Team has won the overall 2019 Blancpain GT Series Championship with support from Lamborghini Squadra Corse, with drivers Andrea Caldarelli and Marco Mapelli securing Lamborghini's second overall championship in the series in three seasons.

Huracán GT3 Evo 2 (2023–present)
In 2022 Lamborghini unveiled the Huracán GT3 Evo 2, which could be purchased as a new car or as an upgrade kit for previous generations. The GT3 Evo 2 takes styling cues from the Huracán STO. It features a new intake system and aerodynamic package.

Huracán Super Trofeo GT2 (2021–present)

The Huracán Super Trofeo GT2 was first announced in 2020, making the Super Trofeo eligible for GT2 competition.

Teams who already owned a Huracán Super Trofeo could purchase a kit to convert their car into the GT2 version, allowing for teams to compete in both the Super Trofeo series and the GT2 series using the same chassis. This can be done with all three generations of the super trofeo.

Records and controversy
In October 2016, a prototype of the Huracán Performante set a lap time of 6:52.01 on the Nürburgring Nordschleife, with Marco Mapelli behind the wheel, making it one of the world's fastest production cars around the track. This lap was also made on Marco Mapelli's first attempt. However, some critics have stated complaints around the car's lap time, from the official video being sped up to make the lap believable, to the speeds displayed in the video being false or that it did not use road tires. However, Lamborghini was able to prove that the lap the Performante did was fully legitimate exactly a week after the lap around the Nordschleife when they revealed the data to car website Road & Track. Máté Petrány of R&T had met with lead engineer of Lamborghini, Maurizio Reggiani, to ask about the lap. It was then revealed by Reggiani that the Performante's active aerodynamic system called Aerodinamica Lamborghini Attiva is what gives the car the greatest improvement in lap time. What is more important is the spoilers snapping into their lowest-drag setting when the Performante is aimed forward, which results in the removal of acceleration impediment that big aero causes. The Huracán Performante's lap time was beaten by the Porsche 911 GT2 RS which set a lap time of 6:47.3 in September 2017.

References

External links

Huracan
Roadsters
Coupés
Rear mid-engine, all-wheel-drive vehicles
Rear mid-engine, rear-wheel-drive vehicles
Cars introduced in 2014
Vehicles with four-wheel steering